The One Hundred Fourth Wisconsin Legislature convened from January 15, 2019, to May 12, 2020, in regular session.  The Legislature also held two extraordinary sessions, on February 28, 2019, and April 14–16, 2020, and six special sessions: November 7, 2019; January 28, 2020April 16, 2020; February 11, 2020February 25, 2020; April 4, 2020April 8, 2020; April 7, 2020April 8, 2020; and August 31, 2020December 22, 2020.  The 2nd year of the 104th Legislature was significantly impacted by the COVID-19 pandemic.

Senators representing odd-numbered districts were newly elected for this session and were serving the first two years of a four-year term.  Assembly members were elected to a two-year term.  Assembly members and odd-numbered senators were elected in the general election of November 6, 2018.  Senators representing even-numbered districts were serving the third and fourth year of their four-year term, having been elected in the general election held on November 8, 2016.

Major events
 January 7, 2019: Inauguration of Tony Evers as the 46th Governor of Wisconsin.
 January 25, 2019: The U.S. federal government shutdown over funding for President Donald Trump's planned U.S.–Mexico border wall ended after 35 days without approving new funding for the wall.
 March 23, 2019: The final territory held by the Islamic State of Iraq and the Levant was liberated by Syrian Democratic Forces.
 April 2, 2019: Judge Brian Hagedorn was elected to the Wisconsin Supreme Court.
 October 21, 2019: Governor Tony Evers called a special session of the Legislature to consider gun control legislation.
 October 27, 2019: Abu Bakr al-Baghdadi, the leader of the Islamic State of Iraq and the Levant, killed himself during a raid by U.S. Special Forces near Barisha, Syria.
 December 1, 2019: First known human case of COVID-19, in Wuhan, Hubei, China.
 December 18, 2019: The United States House of Representatives voted to impeach U.S. President Donald Trump for abuse of power and obstruction of Congress.
 January 3, 2020: Iranian General Qasem Soleimani was assassinated by a U.S. drone strike, near Baghdad International Airport in Iraq.
 January 22, 2020: Governor Tony Evers called a special session of the Legislature.
 February 5, 2020: First case of COVID-19 detected in Wisconsin.
 February 5, 2020: United States Senate voted to acquit U.S. President Donald Trump on charges of abuse of power and obstruction of Congress.
 February 6, 2020: Governor Tony Evers called a special session of the Legislature to consider education funding legislation.
 March 19, 2020: First death from COVID-19 in Wisconsin. (155 cases in Wisconsin, 175 deaths in the United States)
 April 3, 2020: Governor Tony Evers called a special session of the Legislature to consider legislation to push back the spring election and make other election process changes to accommodate safe voting in the COVID-19 pandemic.
 April 6, 2020: Governor Tony Evers called a special session of the Legislature to consider legislation to set a new date for the spring election.
 April 7, 2020: The 2020 Wisconsin spring election took place.
 April 13, 2020: Former U.S. Vice President Joe Biden was declared the winner of the 2020 Wisconsin Democratic presidential primary.
 April 13, 2020: Judge Jill Karofsky was elected to the Wisconsin Supreme Court, defeating incumbent Justice Daniel Kelly.
 August 11, 2020: 1,000th death from COVID-19 in Wisconsin. (61,785 cases in Wisconsin, 152,795 deaths in the United States)
 August 23, 2020: Jacob Blake, a black man carrying a knife, was shot four times in the back and three times in the side by a police officer in Kenosha, Wisconsin, provoking several days of protests and unrest.
 August 24, 2020: Governor Tony Evers called a special session of the Legislature to consider legislation on police reform.
 August 25, 2020: Kyle Rittenhouse, a 17-year-old counter-protester, shot and killed two protesters in Kenosha, Wisconsin.
 September 18, 2020: Caleb Frostman, the Secretary of the Wisconsin Department of Workforce Development, is fired by Governor Tony Evers due to unemployment claim backlogs.
 September 18, 2020: Ruth Bader Ginsburg, Associate Justice of the Supreme Court of the United States, died in Washington, D.C.
 October 2, 2020: U.S. President Donald Trump tested positive for COVID-19 and was admitted to Walter Reed National Military Medical Center.
 October 26, 2020: Amy Coney Barrett was confirmed as Associate Justice of the Supreme Court of the United States.
 November 3, 2020: The 2020 United States presidential election took place.
 November 7, 2020: Former U.S. Vice President Joe Biden was declared the winner of the 2020 United States presidential election and elected the 46th President of the United States.
 December 11, 2020: The U.S. Food and Drug Administration issued its first approval for emergency use authorization for a COVID-19 vaccine (Pfizer–BioNTech)
 December 12, 2020: 4,000th death from COVID-19 in Wisconsin. (434,016 cases in Wisconsin, 281,590 deaths in the United States)
 December 19, 2020: Shirley Abrahamson, the 25th Chief Justice of the Wisconsin Supreme Court, died in Berkeley, California.

Major legislation
 March 6, 2020: Act to create 753.0605 of the statutes; relating to: adding 12 circuit court branches to be allocated by the director of state courts. 2019 Wisc. Act 184
 April 15, 2020: Act ... relating to: state government response to the COVID-19 pandemic. 2019 Wisc. Act 185

Party summary

Senate

Assembly

Sessions 
 Regular session: January 15, 2019May 12, 2020
 February 2019 Extraordinary session: February 28, 2019February 28, 2019
 November 2019 Special session: November 7, 2019November 7, 2019
 January 2020 Special session: January 28, 2020April 16, 2020
 February 2020 Special session: February 11, 2020February 25, 2020
 April 2020 Special session 1: April 4, 2020April 8, 2020
 April 2020 Special session 2: April 7, 2020April 8, 2020
 April 2020 Extraordinary session: April 14, 2020April 16, 2020
 August 2020 Special session: August 31, 2020December 22, 2020

Officers

Senate 
 President: Roger Roth (R)
 President pro tempore: Howard Marklein (R)

Majority Leadership 
 Majority Leader: Scott L. Fitzgerald (R)
 Assistant Majority Leader: Dan Feyen (R)
 Majority Caucus Chair: Van H. Wanggaard (R)
 Majority Caucus Vice Chair: Patrick Testin (R)

Minority Leadership 
 Minority Leader: Jennifer Shilling (D) (until April 24, 2020)
 After April 24, 2020: Janet Bewley (D)
 Assistant Minority Leader: Janet Bewley (D) (until April 24, 2020)
 After April 24, 2020: Janis Ringhand (D) 
 Minority Caucus Chair: Mark F. Miller (D)
 Minority Caucus Vice Chair: Janis Ringhand (D) (until April 24, 2020)
 After April 24, 2020: Vacant

Assembly 
 Speaker: Robin Vos (R)
 Speaker pro tempore: Tyler August (R)

Majority Leadership 
 Majority Leader: Jim Steineke (R)
 Assistant Majority Leader: Mary Felzkowski (R)
 Majority Caucus Chair: Dan Knodl (R)

Minority Leadership 
 Minority Leader: Gordon Hintz (D)
 Assistant Minority Leader: Dianne Hesselbein (D)
 Minority Caucus Chair: Mark Spreitzer (D)

Members

Senate 
Members of the Wisconsin Senate for the 104th Wisconsin Legislature:

Assembly 
Members of the Assembly for the 104th Wisconsin Legislature:

Committees 
Legislative committees and leadership for the 104th Legislature.

Joint committees
 Joint Legislative Audit Committee (Assembly Co-chair: Samantha Kerkman; Senate Co-chair: Robert Cowles)
 Joint Legislative Council (Assembly Co-chair: Robert Brooks; Senate Co-chair: Roger Roth)
 Joint Committee for Review of Administrative Rules (Assembly Co-chair: Joan Ballweg; Senate Co-chair: Stephen Nass)
 Joint Committee on Employment Relations (Assembly Co-chair: Robin Vos; Senate Co-chair: Roger Roth)
 Joint Committee on Finance (Assembly Co-chair: John Nygren; Senate Co-chair: Alberta Darling)
 Joint Committee on Information Policy and Technology (Assembly Co-chair: Dan Knodl; Senate Co-chair: André Jacque)
 Joint Committee on Legislative Organization (Assembly Co-chair: Robin Vos; Senate Co-chair: Roger Roth)
 Joint Review Committee on Criminal Penalties (Assembly Co-chair: Rob Hutton; Senate Co-chair: Van H. Wanggaard)
 Joint Survey Committee on Retirement Systems (Assembly Co-chair: Kathy Bernier; Senate Co-chair: Mary Felzkowski)
 Joint Survey Committee on Tax Exemptions (Assembly Co-chair: Tyler August; Senate Co-chair: Dale P. Kooyenga)
 Speaker's Task Force on Water Quality (Chair: Todd Novak)

Senate committees
 Senate Committee on Administrative Rules (Chair: Stephen Nass)
 Senate Committee on Agriculture, Revenue and Financial Institutions (Chair: Howard Marklein)
 Senate Committee on Economic Development, Commerce and Trade (Chair: Dan Feyen)
 Senate Committee on Education (Chair: Luther Olsen)
 Senate Committee on Elections, Ethics and Rural Issues (Chair: Kathy Bernier)
 Senate Committee on Finance (Chair: Alberta Darling)
 Senate Committee on Government Operations, Technology and Consumer Protection (Chair: Duey Stroebel)
 Senate Committee on Health and Human Services (Chair: Patrick Testin)
 Senate Committee on Insurance, Financial Services, Government Oversight and Courts (Chair: Dave Craig)
 Senate Committee on Judiciary and Public Safety (Chair: Van H. Wanggaard)
 Senate Committee on Labor and Regulatory Reform (Chair: Stephen Nass)
 Senate Committee on Local Government, Small Business, Tourism and Workforce Development (Chair: André Jacque)
 Senate Committee on Natural Resources and Energy (Chair: Robert Cowles)
 Senate Committee on Public Benefits, Licensing and State-Federal Relations (Chair: Chris Kapenga)
 Senate Committee on Senate Organization (Chair: Scott L. Fitzgerald)
 Senate Committee on Sporting Heritage, Mining and Forestry (Chair: Devin LeMahieu)
 Senate Committee on Transportation, Veterans and Military Affairs (Chair: Jerry Petrowski)
 Senate Committee on Universities, Technical Colleges, Children and Families (Chair: Dale P. Kooyenga)
 Senate Committee on Utilities and Housing (Chair: Devin LeMahieu)

Assembly committees
 Assembly Committee for Review of Administrative Rules
 Assembly Committee on Aging and Long-Term Care
 Assembly Committee on Agriculture
 Assembly Committee on Assembly Organization (Chair: Robin Vos)
 Assembly Committee on Audit
 Assembly Committee on Campaigns and Elections
 Assembly Committee on Children and Families
 Assembly Committee on Colleges and Universities
 Assembly Committee on Community Development
 Assembly Committee on Constitution and Ethics
 Assembly Committee on Consumer Protection
 Assembly Committee on Corrections
 Assembly Committee on Criminal Justice and Public Safety
 Assembly Committee on Education
 Assembly Committee on Employment Relations
 Assembly Committee on Energy and Utilities
 Assembly Committee on Environment
 Assembly Committee on Family Law
 Assembly Committee on Federalism and Interstate Relations
 Assembly Committee on Finance
 Assembly Committee on Financial Institutions
 Assembly Committee on Forestry, Parks and Outdoor Recreation
 Assembly Committee on Government Accountability and Oversight
 Assembly Committee on Health
 Assembly Committee on Housing and Real Estate
 Assembly Committee on Insurance
 Assembly Committee on International Affairs and Commerce
 Assembly Committee on Jobs and the Economy
 Assembly Committee on Judiciary
 Assembly Committee on Labor and Integrated Employment
 Assembly Committee on Local Government
 Assembly Committee on Medicaid Reform and Oversight
 Assembly Committee on Mental Health
 Assembly Committee on Public Benefit Reform
 Assembly Committee on Regulatory Licensing Reform
 Assembly Committee on Rules
 Assembly Committee on Rural Development
 Assembly Committee on Science and Technology
 Assembly Committee on Small Business Development
 Assembly Committee on Sporting Heritage
 Assembly Committee on State Affairs
 Assembly Committee on Substance Abuse and Prevention
 Assembly Committee on Tourism
 Assembly Committee on Transportation
 Assembly Committee on Veterans and Military Affairs
 Assembly Committee on Ways and Means
 Assembly Committee on Workforce Development
 Assembly Speaker's Task Force on Adoption
 Assembly Speaker's Task Force on Racial Disparities
 Assembly Speaker's Task Force on Suicide Prevention
 Assembly Subcommittee on Education and Economic Development
 Assembly Subcommittee on Law Enforcement Policies and Standards

Employees

Senate 
 Chief Clerk: Jeff Renk
 Sergeant at Arms: Ted Blazel

Assembly 
 Chief Clerk: Patrick Fuller
 Sergeant at Arms: Anne Tonnon Byers

See also 
 2016 Wisconsin elections
 2016 Wisconsin State Senate election
 2018 Wisconsin elections
 2018 Wisconsin State Senate election
 2018 Wisconsin State Assembly election

Notes

References

External links 
 Wisconsin State Senate
 Wisconsin State Assembly

2019 establishments in Wisconsin
Wisconsin
Wisconsin
Wisconsin legislative sessions